The Durrell's night gecko (Nactus durrellorum) is a species of lizard in the family Gekkonidae. The species is endemic to the Round Island of Mauritius.

Etymology 
The specific name, durrellorum, is in honor of English zookeeper Gerald Durrell and his second wife, American-born zookeeper Lee McGeorge Durrell.

Taxonomy 

The Durrell's night gecko was described as a subspecies of the Serpent Island gecko, and further erected as a new species in 2000.

When naming it as a new subspecies in 1994, Arnold and Jones used durrelli, which is genitive singular, as the subspecific name. In 2004 Michels and Bauer pointed out that because the subspecies is named in honor of two people, the subspecific name should be in the genitive plural. Accordingly, they changed durrelli to durrellorum.

References

Further reading 

 Arnold EN, Jones CG (1994). "The night geckos of the genus Nactus in the Mascarene Islands with a description of the population on Round Island". Dodo 30: 119–131. (Nactus serpensinsula durrelli [sic], new subspecies).
 Loveridge A (1951). "A New Gecko of the Genus Gymnodactylus from Serpent Island". Proc. Biol. Soc. Washington 64: 91–92. (Gymnodactylus serpensinsula, new species).
 Michels JP, Bauer AM (2004). "Some corrections to the scientific names of amphibians and reptiles". Bonner Zoologische Beiträge 52: 83–94. (Nactus serpensinsula durrellorum [sic], corrected name).

Nactus